Rays from the Rose Cross is a Christian esoteric magazine established in June 1913 by Max Heindel, author of The Rosicrucian Cosmo-Conception and founder of The Rosicrucian Fellowship; its original name was Echoes from Mount Ecclesia. It is issued bimonthly by The Rosicrucian Fellowship in the United States. Its publication has stopped in May/April 2004.

It contains articles on themes as Esoteric Christianity, Astrology, Philosophy, History, Science, Health, Nutrition, Social issues, etc.

External links
Rays from the Rose Cross,  The Rosicrucian Fellowship 
Old Archives: Echoes from Mt. Ecclesia and Rays from the Rose Cross magazine, 1913-1919
Rosicrucian Fellowship Online Magazine Archives 
Rays from the Rose Cross, selected articles PDF and HTML Site edited by a Probationer
 Complete issues 1996 - 2004 Rays from the Rose Cross. The Rosicrucian Fellowship 

1913 establishments in the United States
2004 disestablishments in the United States
Bimonthly magazines published in the United States
Religious magazines published in the United States
Christian magazines
Defunct magazines published in the United States
Esoteric Christianity
Magazines established in 1913
Magazines disestablished in 2004
Rosicrucianism
Magazines published in California